A chain store or retail chain is a retail outlet in which several locations share a brand, central management and standardized business practices. They have come to dominate the retail and dining markets and many service categories, in many parts of the world. A franchise retail establishment is one form of chain store.  In 2005, the world's largest retail chain, Walmart, became the world's largest corporation based on gross sales.

History

In 1792, Henry Walton Smith and his wife Anna established W.H. Smith as a news vending business in London that would become a national concern in the mid-19th century under the management of their grandson William Henry Smith. The world's oldest national retail chain, the firm took advantage of the railway boom during the Industrial Revolution by opening news-stands at railway stations beginning in 1848. The firm, now called WHSmith, had more than 1,400 locations as of 2017.

In the U.S., chain stores likely began with J. Stiner & Company, which operated several tea shops in New York City around 1860. By 1900, George Huntington Hartford had built The Great Atlantic & Pacific Tea Company, originally a tea distributor based in New York, into a grocery chain that operated almost 200 stores. Dozens of other grocery, drug, tobacco, and variety stores opened additional locations, around the same time, so that retail chains were common in the United States by 1910. Several state legislatures considered measures to restrict the growth of chains, and in 1914 concern about chain stores as a factor in passage of the Federal Trade Commission Act and the Clayton Antitrust Act.

Isidore, Benjamin and Modeste Dewachter  originated the idea of the chain department store in Belgium in 1868, ten years before A&P began offering more than coffee and tea. They started with four locations for Maisons Dewachter (Houses of Dewachter): La Louvière, Mons, Namur and Leuze. They later incorporated as Dewachter frères (Dewachter Brothers) on January 1, 1875. The brothers offered ready-to-wear clothing for men and children and specialty clothing such as riding apparel and beachwear. Isidore owned 51% of the company, while his brothers split the remaining 49%. Under Isidore's (and later his son Louis') leadership, Maisons Dewachter would become one of the most recognized names in Belgium and France with stores in 20 cities and towns. Some cities had multiple stores, such as Bordeaux, France. Louis Dewachter also became an internationally known landscape artist, painting under the pseudonym Louis Dewis.

By the early 1920s, chain retailing was well established in the United States, with A&P, Woolworth's, American Stores, and United Cigar Stores being the largest. By the 1930s, chain stores had come of age, and stopped increasing their total market share. Court decisions against the chains' price-cutting appeared as early as 1906, and laws against chain stores began in the 1920s, along with legal countermeasures by chain-store groups. State taxes on chain stores were upheld by the U.S. Supreme Court in 1931. Between then and 1933, 525 chain-store tax bills were introduced in state legislatures, and by the end of 1933 special taxes on retail chains were in force in 17 states.

Characteristics
A chain store is characterised by the ownership or franchise relationship between the local business or outlet and a controlling business.

Difference between a "chain" and formula retail
While chains are typically "formula retail", a chain refers to ownership or franchise, whereas "formula retail" or "formula business" refers to the characteristics of the business. There is considerable overlap because key characteristic of a formula retail business is that it is controlled as a part of a business relationship, and is generally part of a chain. Nevertheless, most codified municipal regulation relies on definitions of formula retail (e.g., formula restaurants), in part because a restriction directed to "chains" may be deemed an impermissible restriction on interstate commerce (in the US), or as exceeding municipal zoning authority (i.e., regulating "who owns it" rather than the characteristics of the business).  Non-codified restrictions will sometimes target "chains". A municipal ordinance may seek to prohibit "formula businesses" in order to maintain the character of a community and support local businesses that serve the surrounding neighborhood.

Decline
Brick-and-mortar chain stores have been in decline as retail has shifted to online shopping, leading to historically high retail vacancy rates. The hundred-year-old Radio Shack chain went from 7,400 stores in 2001 to 400 stores in 2018.  FYE is the last remaining music chain store in the United States and has shrunk from over 1000 at its height to 270 locations in 2018. In 2019, Payless ShoeSource stated that it would be closing all remaining 2,100 stores in the US.

Restaurant chains

A restaurant chain is a set of related restaurants in many different locations that are either under shared corporate ownership (e.g., McDonald's in the U.S.) or franchising agreements. Typically, the restaurants within a chain are built to a standard format through architectural prototype development and offer a standard menu and/or services. 

Fast food restaurants are the most common, but sit-down restaurant chains also exist. In 1896, Samuel Isaacs from Whitechapel, east London opened the first fish and chips restaurant (as opposed to a take-away) in London, and its popularity saw a rapid expansion of the chain with further restaurants around London and outside including Brighton, Ramsgate, Margate and other seaside resorts in southern England. In 1864, the Aerated Bread Company (ABC) began operating a chain of teashops in Britain. ABC would be overtaken as the leader in the field by Lyons, co-founded by Joseph Lyons in 1884. From 1909 Lyons began operating a chain of teashops which became a staple of the High Street in the UK, and at its peak, the firm numbered around 200 cafes. Restaurant chains are often found near highways, shopping malls and densely populated urban or tourist areas.

Opposition

The displacement of independent businesses by chains has sparked increased collaboration among independent businesses and communities to prevent chain proliferation. These efforts include community-based organizing through Independent Business Alliances (in the U.S. and Canada) and "buy local" campaigns. In the U.S., trade organizations such as the American Booksellers Association and American Specialty Toy Retailers do national promotion and advocacy. NGOs like the New Rules Project and New Economics Foundation provide research and tools for pro-independent business education and policy while the American Independent Business Alliance provides direct assistance for community-level organizing.

Regulation and exclusion
A variety of towns and cities in the United States whose residents wish to retain their distinctive character—such as San Francisco; Provincetown, Massachusetts and other Cape Cod villages; Bristol, RI; McCall, Idaho; Port Townsend, Washington; Ogunquit, Maine; Windermere, Florida and Carmel-by-the-Sea, California—closely regulate, even exclude, chain stores. They don't exclude the chain itself, only the standardized formula the chain uses, described as "formula businesses". For example, there could often be a restaurant owned by McDonald's that sells hamburgers, but not the formula franchise operation with the golden arches and standardized menu, uniforms, and procedures. The reason these towns regulate chain stores is aesthetics and tourism.  Proponents of formula restaurants and formula retail allege the restrictions are used to protect independent businesses from competition.

See also

 Formula restaurant
 List of bookstore chains
 List of Canadian clothing store chains
 List of clothing and footwear shops in the United Kingdom
 List of restaurant chains
 List of supermarket chains

References

Further reading
 Carroll, Glenn R., and Magnus Thor Torfason. "Restaurant Organizational Forms and Community in the US in 2005." City & Community 10#1 (2011): 1–24.
 Ingram, Paul, and Hayagreeva Rao. "Store Wars: The Enactment and Repeal of Anti‐Chain‐Store Legislation in America." American Journal of Sociology 110#2 (2004): 446–487.
 Lebhar, Godfrey Montague, and W. C. Shaw. Chain stores in America, 1859-1962 (Chain Store Publishing Corporation, 1963).
 Levinson, Marc. "The Great A&P and the Struggle for Small Business in America" (2019). .
 Matsunaga, Louella. ;;The changing face of Japanese retail: Working in a chain store (Routledge, 2012).
 Newman, Benjamin J., and John V. Kane. "Backlash against the 'Big Box', Local Small Business and Public Opinion toward Business Corporations." Public Opinion Quarterly 78#4 (2014): 984-1002.
 Phillips, Charles F. "The Chain Store in the United States and Canada," American Economic Review 27#1 (1937), pp. 87–95 in JSTOR
 Schragger, Richard. "The Anti-Chain Store Movement, Localist Ideology, and the Remnants of the Progressive Constitution, 1920-1940." Iowa Law Review 90 (2005): 1011+.
 Scroop, Daniel. "The anti-chain store movement and the politics of consumption." American Quarterly 60#4 (2008): 925–949.
 Winship, Janice. "Culture of restraint: the British chain store 1920–39." Commercial Cultures: Economies, Practices, Spaces'' 31 (2000).

External links
 

Retail formats
Retail processes and techniques
Business terms
Franchises